The Last Starship from Earth is a 1968 science fiction novel by John Boyd, and is his best known novel.

Setting 
The novel is set in a dystopian society in the very near future.  Although it is not obvious at first, this is also an alternate history story.

In this world, instead of preaching peace and forgiveness and being crucified, Jesus became a revolutionary agitator and assembled an army to overthrow the Roman Empire, establishing a theocracy before being killed by a crossbow, which becomes a religious symbol similar to the cross in our timeline. The regime established by Jesus continues to the present day, having dominated the entire world and mingled with scientific ideas and advanced technology, including a Church led by an AI pope.

Marriage and mating are related to genes, so there is a strong system of castes.

Plot summary
The central character is Haldane IV, a mathematician who forms a caste-forbidden relationship with Helix, a poetess. He also becomes interested in investigating Fairweather, a famous mathematician who lived shortly before his time, and his son Fairweather II, whom he discovers led a failed rebellion.

Haldane and Helix are discovered and there is a show trial, which results in Haldane being exiled to "Hell" (a planet orbiting a distant star), where he meets Fairweather II and is reunited with Helix. It is revealed that Helix is Fairweather II's daughter; Fairweather II needed a mathematician for his time machine, and Helix was sent to Earth to engineer the exile of a mathematician to pilot an experimental time machine. Fairweather II makes Haldane immortal and sends him on a mission to go back in time and kill Jesus under his new name, "Judas Iscariot".

In an epilogue, Haldane captures Jesus, puts him in the time machine and sends him back. He returns to the present day, which is much more similar to our timeline, and meets a girl who is very similar to Helix.

Trilogy
The book is supposedly the first in a trilogy. The other books appear to be The Pollinators of Eden, and The Rakehells of Heaven.

Critical response
Robert A. Heinlein said, "It belongs on the same shelf with 1984 and Brave New World," and the Los Angeles Times noted, "In the literate tradition of Huxley, Orwell, and Bradbury, it is a work of extraordinary impact." Joanna Russ, in her review of the book in 1969, was highly critical and wrote, "I forgive Mr. Boyd the anguish his novel caused me and hope he will eventually forgive me the anguish this review may cause him, but for Berkley there is no forgiveness. Only reform. Don't do it again."

Spider Robinson, however, praised the novel as "delightful, with a rigorously consistent internal logic that doesn't really become apparent until the very last chapter."

References

External links
Fantastic Fiction on the novel

1968 American novels
1968 science fiction novels
Dystopian novels
American alternate history novels
Religion in science fiction
Alternate history novels set in ancient Rome
Novels about time travel
Christianity in fiction